Azovo is the name of several rural localities in Russia:
Azovo, Republic of Bashkortostan, a village in Uzunlarovsky Selsoviet of Arkhangelsky District of the Republic of Bashkortostan
Azovo, Omsk Oblast, a selo in Azovsky Rural Okrug of Azovsky Nemetsky National District of Omsk Oblast
Azovo, Perm Krai, a village in Karagaysky District of Perm Krai
Azovo, Pskov Oblast, a village in Pytalovsky District of Pskov Oblast